Kozet is a rural locality (an aul) and the administrative center of Kozetskoye Rural Settlement of Takhtamukaysky District, the Republic of Adygea, Russia. The population was 2203 as of 2018. There are 82 streets.

Geography 
The aul is located on the left bank of the Kuban River, 10 km north of Takhtamukay (the district's administrative centre) by road. Novy is the nearest rural locality.

Ethnicity 
The aul is inhabited by Adyghes, Russians and Armenians.

References 

Rural localities in Takhtamukaysky District